The Community Service Organization (founded 1947) was an important California Latino civil rights organization, most famous for training Cesar Chavez and Dolores Huerta. It was founded in 1947 by Fred Ross, Antonio Rios and Edward Roybal and was a source of political support for Roybal during his long political career.  Ross had been hired by Saul Alinsky and was employed by his Industrial Areas Foundation.

Community Service Organization, now Centro CSO remains active. The group based in Boyle Heights is fighting against police killings of Chicanos, the environmental cleanup of Exide, against privatization of education, and for legalization of the undocumented.

The archives of the Community Service Organization are held at Stanford University as well as at California State University, Northridge in the Library's Special Collections and Archives.

References

External links
CSO Project
Documentary: Organize! The Lessons of the Community Service Organization
LA Times Article: Anthony P. "Tony" Rios

Mexican-American history
Mexican-American culture in California
Civil rights organizations in the United States
Organizations established in 1947
1947 establishments in California
Cesar Chavez